A Mobed, Mowbed, or Mobad (Middle Persian: 𐭬𐭢𐭥𐭯𐭲) is a Zoroastrian cleric of a particular rank. Unlike an herbad (ervad), a mobed is qualified to serve as celebrant priest at the Yasna ceremony and other higher liturgical ceremonies. A mobed is also qualified to train other priests.

Usage 
In general (lay) use, the term is also used as an honorific to denote any Zoroastrian priest, of any rank. For instance, Hormizd I appointed Kartir moabadan-moabad, which is frequently translated as "priest of priests", but more precisely indicates "high priest of high priests".

The term "mobed" is a contraction of Middle Persian magu-pati, the first half of the expression apparently deriving from Avestan 𐬨𐬀𐬔𐬀 maga- or magu-, and with Avestan 𐬞𐬀𐬌𐬙𐬌 -paiti meaning "guardian" or "protector" (Persian root of  pâyidan) as in azarpäd. Through Old Persian 𐎶𐎦𐏁 magush and Ancient Greek μάγος magos, Old Iranian magu- is also identified as the origin of the Latin word magus, a "magian". Through the Greek adjective μαγικός magikos and Old French magique, 'mobed' is distantly related to the English language word "magic".

The word was borrowed into Georgian as Mogvi (მოგვი).

Mobedyars 
Zoroastrian priests in the Parsi community in India are required to be male from a priestly family (the "Athornan" class or caste). The Athornan Mobeds have held the responsibility of preserving and promoting religion since pre-Zoroastrian times of King Jamshed in Persia. "[I]n the early to mid 1900s, for various reasons, the young of the then Mobeds were encouraged by their elders to be initiated as Mobeds but to pursue other careers and professions. Though this resulted in a shortage of Mobeds [in India], it generated an unexpected benefit to Zoroastrianism. Highly educated and enterprising young Mobeds settled in North America following their secular studies and founded the Mobed base for the benefit of North American Zoroastrians." However, due to the shortage of priests, the Parsi Zoroastrian Community in India started to consider a project to train any male Zoroastrian to serve as a Mobed assistant, termed Paramobed, in the 1970s; the plan was launched in the early 2000s using a new term for these priestly assistants: Behdin Pasbans.

In 1995, the North American Mobeds Council (NAMC) created a program to teach and ordain assistants to Mobeds, called Mobedyars or Paramobeds, to address a shortage of available Mobeds across North America. The program was initially open to any male Zoroastrian, irrespective of Athornan (priestly) or Behdhin (non-priestly) caste or lineage. The first Mobedyar was ordained in Virginia in late 1997. Another NAMC-trained Mobedyar was ordained in California in 2004, after several years of serving the community. In 2008, the NAMC amended the original resolution passed in 1999 to broaden the criteria for the eligibility and training of Mobedyars to include Zoroastrian women. As of 2010, the North American Mobeds Council had successfully trained six Mobedyars to perform outer liturgical ceremonies and bereavement services in the absence of an ordained Priest. 

In 2009-2010, the chairman of the Council of Zoroastrian Priests in Tehran, Iran, Mobed Soroushpur, suggested opening the priesthood to Zoroastrian women after research on ancient Zoroastrian documents that revealed evidence of female clergy in ancient Persian times. "The concepts of equality have always been at the basis of our culture. In antiquity, there were many female priests, politicians, warriors and this even up to the Sasanian time,” he said. Potential corroboration may be found in the oral tradition of the Parsis, which acknowledges a female Zoroastrian priest named Testar as among the Zoroastrians who fled religious persecution and forced conversions in Arab-conquered Persia to establish a new homeland in Sanjan, Gujarat around the 9th Century AD. In 2011, eight female Mobedyars (also termed Mobediars) were certified to serve the Zoroastrian community as Mobedyars. However, female Mobedyars in Iran may be restricted in their ability to serve their community in the same manner as Mobeds, such as tending to fires in Zoroastrian temples.  

Zoroastrian women have since been ordained in Iran and North America to serve the community as Mobedyars, meaning assistant Mobeds. Since the Mobedyar program was initiated in North America, there has been some pushback on the restrictions placed on ordained Mobedyars by the NAMC regarding the types of ceremonies Mobedyars may perform, as the community also grapples with the question of whether to permit any Zoroastrian to train to become a full-fledged Mobed, irrespective of caste, lineage, or gender. The concept of a "universal priesthood" would promote and encourage persons to train to become Mobeds and Mobedyars "regardless of their gender, ancestry or background".

References

Sources 
 

 Mobed